Talat Hussain may refer to:

Talat Hussain (actor) (born 1945), Pakistani actor and screenwriter
Syed Talat Hussain (born 1966), Pakistani journalist

See also
Hussain